Mane Bhanjyang is a village development committee in Bhojpur District in Province No. 1 of eastern Nepal. According to 1991 census, it had a population of 2,832 living in 503 individual households. Mane Bhanjyang is the birthplace and hometown of Nepal's current president, Bidhya Devi Bhandari.

References

External links
UN map of the municipalities of Bhojpur District

Populated places in Bhojpur District, Nepal